There are multiple archaeological sites in Bahrain. Bahrain is an island country in the Persian Gulf consisting of a small archipelago centred around Bahrain Island. It is believed to be the location of the Dilmun civilisation, dating back to the 4th millennium BC. There are two archaeological sites that were recognized as UNESCO World Heritage Sites - the Bahrain Fort and the Dilmun Burial Mounds.

List
The following is a list of notable archaeological sites in the country:

 Ain Umm Sujoor
 Barbar Temple
 Bu Maher Fort
 Dilmun Burial Mounds
 Diraz Temple
 Khamis Mosque
 Qal'at al-Bahrain
 Riffa Fort

Gallery

See also
 History of Bahrain

References

Bahrain

archaeological sites